Matt or Matthew Brennan may refer to:
Matt Brennan (politician) (born 1936), Irish politician
Matt Brennan (academic) (born 1979), Canadian author, musician, and academic
Matt Brennan (American football) (1897–1963), American football back
Matt Brennan (footballer) (born 1943), Scottish footballer
Matthew Brennan, namesake of Mount Brennan